Bockarie Kortu Stevens (born December 30, 1950) is a Sierra Leonean diplomat and the current Sierra Leonean Ambassador to the United States; and also Sierra Leone's permanent representative to the World Bank and the International Monetary Fund (IMF). He is the son of Sierra Leone's first president Siaka Stevens.

In October 2007, Bockarie Stevens was appointed as Sierra Leone's Ambassador to the United States by  Sierra Leone's president Ernest Bai Koroma. Bockarie Stevens is a prominent member of the All People's Congress (APC) political party.

From 1986 to 1992, Bockarie Stevens served as Sierra Leone's ambassador to Guinea, under then Sierra Leone's president Joseph Saidu Momoh, who was one of the closest allies to his father, Siaka Stevens, who personally hand-picked Momoh to succeed him to the presidency when he retired in 1985.

Bockarie Stevens is a 1975 graduate from Fourah Bay College, University of Sierra Leone with a  B.A. in History and Politics. He earned  a Diploma in Industrial Relations and Personnel Management from the London School of Economics and Political Science in June 1982, and an M.A. in Refugee Studies from the University of East London in 2002.

Family
Bockarie Kortu Stevens was born on December 30, 1950, in Moyamba, Moyamba District in the Southern Province of British Sierra Leone.  His paternal uncle was former Sierra Leone's president, Siaka Stevens, who ruled Sierra Leone between 1967 and 1988,  mostly under a one-party state.

Education
Bockarie Stevens attended and graduated from Albert Academy secondary school in Freetown. The same secondary school his father, the late former Sierra Leone's president, Siaka Stevens had attended years earlier. Fourah Bay College, University of Sierra Leone.  Bockarie Stevens is a 1975 graduate from  Fourah Bay College, University of Sierra Leone with a B.A. in History and Politics. He earned  a Diploma in Industrial Relations and Personnel Management from the London School of Economics and Political Science in June 1982, and an M.A. in Refugee Studies from the University of East London in 2002.

Diplomatic career
In 1986, Bockarie Stevens was appointed by then Sierra Leone's president Joseph Saidu Momoh as Sierra Leone's ambassador to Guinea, and he served as Sierra Leone's ambassador to Guinea until 1992 when the a group of junior officers in the Sierra Leone military ousted the Sierra Leone government in a bloodless military coup.

Family and children
Bockarie Stevens is married to Musu Stevens, and they have five children.

References

External links
https://web.archive.org/web/20160304052712/http://www.cocorioko.net/?p=11425
http://www.newstimeafrica.com/archives/14972
https://web.archive.org/web/20100711124907/http://www.sierraexpressmedia.com/archives/4274

1950 births
Living people
Ambassadors of Sierra Leone to the United States
All People's Congress politicians
Fourah Bay College alumni
Alumni of the University of East London
Alumni of the London School of Economics
People from Moyamba District